Peg + Cat is an animated children's television series based on the children's picture book "The Chicken Problem", which was published in 2012. The series, which featured the voice acting of Hayley Faith Negrin and Dwayne Hill, was created by Billy Aronson and Jennifer Oxley and produced by Fred Rogers Productions and 9 Story Media Group. It debuted on most PBS stations on October 7, 2013, as part of the revamped PBS Kids brand, and aired 63 episodes through April 23, 2018. In Canada the show is broadcast on Treehouse TV.

The show is targeted to children 3 to 5 years old. The goal is to "inspire preschoolers’ natural curiosity about math and help them develop new skills and strategies for solving problems creatively in their daily lives." In keeping with the math theme, the animation is presented as if it were drawn on graph paper.

On March 3, 2015, PBS Kids renewed Peg + Cat for a second season, which started on April 4, 2016. On March 28, 2016, a one-hour two-part film aired on PBS Kids. This new film, titled Peg + Cat Save the World, focused on the duo being called upon by the President of the United States (voiced by Sandra Oh), to prevent a global disaster. On March 14, 2016, PBS Kids released the first part of the film on its YouTube channel.

Characters
Peg – The main character, together with her talking cat, Cat. She is a young girl who wears a red hat and blue dress. She explains the situation in each episode directly to the "camera", announces when they have "a big problem", and reasons out solutions to math-related problems. During songs, she pulls out a ukulele and plays it. She has a special blue marble hidden under her hat. Her favorite crayon is "little bluey". She is voiced by Hayley Faith Negrin.
Cat – An indigo cat whose best friend is Peg. He loves circles and accompanies Peg on her adventures. Cat often inspires Peg to realize a solution to a problem without being aware of it himself. Often helps to calm Peg when she is "totally freaking out". He was inspired by Jennifer Oxley's  pet cat. He is voiced by Dwayne Hill.
Ramone – A  boy who shows up to help Peg and Cat with their math problems. He is voiced by Thamela Mpumlwana in season 1 and Jaiden Lewis in season 2.
Pig – A pig who is usually silent except when he sings in a rich operatic tenor. His favorite shape is the triangle. Voiced by Tommy Wazelle.
Neighbor Ladies – A female African American character named Viv and a female Asian American character named Connie that appear in several episodes. They often accidentally add to Peg and Cat's problems by trying to be nice. Viv is voiced by Angela Teek and Connie is voiced by Jean Yoon. 
100 Chickens – Chickens who play and live on farm and travel to space with Pig, Peg, and Cat. Voiced by Rob Morrison and Carys Casucci.
The Pirates and their parrot – A quarrelsome quartet of pirates who live on an island. They like to sing in four-part harmony but sing "really bad" when they get cranky. They have had a sleepover with Peg and Cat. Voiced by Rob Morrison.
Big Mouth – A blue, furry, horned space monster who likes to eat things that are little and yellow.
Richard – A space alien from the purple planet who plays with Peg and Cat in space. He often cries during tense situations. Voiced by Christian DiStefano.
The Teens – Three cool older kids who love pizza and texting on their phones, but can't stand getting dirt on their clothes. Tessa (voiced by Addison Holley) is thirteen, Mora (voiced by Annick Obonsawin) is fourteen, and Jesse (voiced by Gabriel Giammaria) is fifteen.
Giants – Peg and Cat's big friends who live up the beanstalk in Fairy Tale Land. In The Giant Problem Peg and Cat think that the Giants are going to eat them. Voiced by Bryce Kulak (Giant) and Shoshana Sperling (Giantess).
Mermaid – A swimming damsel who lives in the Magical Forest. The Pig stole her Golden Pyramid's in The Golden Pyramid Problem. She is voiced by Emilie-Claire Barlow.
The Three Bears, The Three Pigs, The Three Billy Goats Gruff - Nine Friends of Peg and Cat that get into bands like The Electric Eleven. Voiced by Kevin Brathwite (Papa Bear), Angela Teek (Mama Bear), Phatt Al (Baby Bear), and Rob Morrison (Three Little Pigs and Three Billy Goats Gruff).
The Blockettes – Five dancers that dance in the Radio City Music Hall. Voiced by Allie Hughes, Jennifer Wallis, and Katie Griffin.
Mac – A gruff-voiced man who works various jobs in different episodes. Voiced by Kevin Del Aguila.
Peg's Mom – Voiced by Alison Jutzi.
The Seven Dwarves - Voiced by Rob Morrison.
Dragon – A mythical creature who lives in the Magical Forest.
Ludwig van Beethoven – A famous music composer who has problems writing music. Voiced by Rob Morrison
George Washington – The first president of the United States. Voiced by Kyle McDonald.
Albert Einstein – A famous scientist. Voiced by John Stocker.
Flat Woman – A supervillainess who likes to make things flat. Voiced by Julie Lemieux.
Baby Fox – A young little fox who likes building his block tower and stays with Mrs. Sheep.
Romeo and Juliet – Two young lovers from William Shakespeare's stage play of the same name.
Triceratops - An adult blue dinosaur who talks. Randomly says "Horn!" during conversation.
Baby T. rex - A baby dinosaur with a voracious appetite who can't talk but instead shrieks. Seen frequently with Triceratops.
Cleopatra - Peg + Cat's Queen of the Nile friend, along with her pet camel "Epidermis". Voiced by Patience Mpumlwana.
Marie Curie - Voiced by Linda Ballantyne.
Roxanne - A pink French cat. Voiced by Paula McNeil
Grandmom and Granddad - Peg's grandparents who are obsessed with the 1960s. Voiced respectfully by Judy Marshack and Jim Codrington.
The President of the United States - Voiced by Sandra Oh.
Robin Hood - A robin loosely based on the British folklore hero of the same name.
Aki - A ninja in training. Voiced by Mika Shimozato.
Billie Holiday - A famous jazz singer.

Episodes

Series overview

Season 1 (2013–15)

Season 2 (2016–18)

Critical reception 
Peg + Cat has received generally positive reviews from television critics and parents of young children. Ryan Berenz of Channel Guide Magazine wrote, "Problem solved: PEG + CAT equals fun!"

Awards
Peg + Cat has won seven Daytime Emmy Awards: Outstanding Pre-School Children's Animated Program, Outstanding Performer in an Animated Program (Hayley Faith Negrin), Outstanding Individual Achievement in Animation (Jennifer Oxley, production designer), Outstanding Writing in a Pre-School Animated Program (includes Peg + Cat co-creators Billy Aronson and Jennifer Oxley, Kevin Del Aguila, Dustin Ferrer, David Steven Cohen, Qui Nguyen, and writers), and Outstanding Music Direction and Composition (Steven Rebollido, music supervisor; J. Walter Hawkes, music director; and Martin Erskine and D. D. Jackson, composers).

Merchandise
In late 2016, Fred Rogers Productions and 9 Story Media Group signed a deal with the Montreal-based toy manufacturer Imports Dragon to create an assortment of plush, arts-and-crafts sets, games and wooden puzzles based on the Peg + Cat characters.

The toys join numerous books from Candlewick Press, as well as DVDs from PBS Distribution in the U.S., eOne in Canada, ABC Commercial in Australia and Sony Music in Germany.

References

External links

2013 American television series debuts
2013 Canadian television series debuts
2018 American television series endings
2018 Canadian television series endings
2010s American animated television series
2010s Canadian animated television series
2010s preschool education television series
American children's animated adventure television series
American children's animated fantasy television series
American flash animated television series
American preschool education television series
American television shows based on children's books
Animated preschool education television series
Animated television series about cats
Animated television series about children
Canadian children's animated adventure television series
Canadian children's animated fantasy television series
Canadian flash animated television series
Canadian preschool education television series
Canadian television shows based on children's books
English-language television shows
Mathematics education television series
Daytime Emmy Award winners
PBS Kids shows
PBS original programming
Television series by 9 Story Media Group